1-Nonene is particular structural isomer of nonene where the double bond is located at the primary, or alpha, position making it a  linear alpha olefin. It is used in the production of surfactants and lubricants, usually by way of nonylphenol. Its more branched analogue, tripropylene, is also used in this way.

References

Alkenes